Manikandan is a given name. Notable people with the name include:

 Manikandan (born 1983), Indian actor
 Manikandan R. Achari, Indian actor
 Manikandan Pattambi, Indian actor
 M. Manikandan, Indian cinematographer, writer, and director

Indian given names